Cape of Hate is the second EP by cybergrind band Genghis Tron. Only 150 copies were made, and they were sold at the band's 2006 spring tour supporting their first EP, Cloak of Love. It contains various remixes and demos of the tracks from Cloak of Love.

Track listing

References

Genghis Tron albums
2006 EPs